Fritz Leutwiler (30 July 1924 in Baden – 27 May 1997 in Zumikon) was a Swiss economist. After his studies at the University of Zurich (PhD in 1948), he worked at the Schweizerischer Bankverein, the predecessor of today's UBS, in London.

In 1952, he was hired by the Swiss National Bank as a scientific collaborator. He was made member of their directorial board in 1959. From 1974 until 1984, he presided the national bank. Later, from 1982 until 1984, he was also president of the Bank for International Settlements.

In his later career, he led the electrical engineering company Brown, Boveri & Cie as the president of its governing board (1985-1992), managing its later fusion with the Swedish ASEA company. Other enterprises of which he was a member of the governing board were:
 Ciba-Geigy
 Nestlé
 Precious Woods, a company specializing in tropical wood.

He married Andrée Marguerite Cottier, daughter of a previous Motor-Columbus CEO. Motor-Columbus was an engineering and financing company active in the area of hydro and nuclear power, founded on the initiative of Brown Boveri, which made the hardware for such power plants.

Sources 
 

1924 births
1997 deaths
Swiss economists
People from Baden, Switzerland

de:Fritz Leutwiler